Koziołek may refer to the following places:
Koziołek, Kuyavian-Pomeranian Voivodeship (north-central Poland)
Koziołek, Łódź Voivodeship (central Poland)
Koziołek, Masovian Voivodeship (east-central Poland)